Time Capsule: The Best of Matthew Sweet 90/00 is a compilation album by alternative rock musician Matthew Sweet.  It was released on Volcano Entertainment in 2000. It contains two new songs: "Ready" and "So Far".

Track listing
All songs written by Matthew Sweet.

 "Divine Intervention" - 5:37 (Girlfriend)
 "I've Been Waiting" - 3:36 (Girlfriend)
 "Girlfriend" - 3:40 (Girlfriend)
 "You Don't Love Me" - 5:21 (Girlfriend)
 "Time Capsule" - 3:56 (Altered Beast)
 "The Ugly Truth" [acoustic version] - 3:18 (Altered Beast)
 "Devil With the Green Eyes" [remix] - 4:41 (Son of Altered Beast)
 "Someone to Pull the Trigger" -3:55 (Altered Beast)
 "Sick of Myself" - 3:38 (100% Fun)
 "We're the Same" - 3:03 (100% Fun)
 "Where You Get Love" - 3:35 (Blue Sky on Mars)
 "Until You Break" - 4:50 (Blue Sky on Mars)
 "Behind the Smile" - 2:23 (Blue Sky on Mars)
 "If Time Permits" - 3:03 (In Reverse)
 "What Matters" - 4:13 (In Reverse)
 "Hide" - 4:02 (In Reverse)
 "Ready" - 3:57
 "So Far" - 3:17

References

2000 compilation albums
Matthew Sweet albums
Volcano Entertainment compilation albums